Build It Up is a full-length album released by indie rock band One for the Team based out of Minneapolis, Minnesota. The album was recorded in April 2008 at Fur Seal Studios with Rob Skoro and Joe Johnson and subsequently released jointly on Militia Group and Afternoon Records labels in 2008.

Track listing
"Apples"
"Best Supporting Actor"
"Dress Up Party"
"A Better Job"
"Build It Up"
"Hey Kid"
"Questions and Panthers"
"You Know Culture"
"Deconstruction Site"
"What Are You Gonna Cry About?"
"Oh No"
"We Can Work It Out"

2008 albums

References